Sami Ristiniemi (born 1977) is a Finnish actor. He has played Rafael Aro in Salatut elämät, and he also hosts the Finnish game show Shop 'til You Drop on Jim.

References

Finnish male actors
1977 births
Living people